American garage punk band the Cramps was active from 1976 until 2009. Its discography consists of nine studio albums, two live albums, four compilations, two EPs, and 23 singles. The band also produced eight music videos.

Albums

Studio albums

Live albums

Compilation albums

Extended plays

Singles

Music videos
 1978 – "Human Fly"
 1979 – "Garbageman"
 1980 – "Tear It Up" (live) – from the movie Urgh! A Music War
 1990 – "Bikini Girls with Machine Guns" (two versions: regular and explicit)
 1990 – "Creature from the Black Leather Lagoon"
 1994 – "Ultra Twist" (two versions: regular and X-rated)
 1994 – "Naked Girl Falling Down the Stairs"
 1997 – "Like a Bad Girl Should"

Bootleg albums

This is an incomplete list of bootlegs, which can or may never satisfy any subjective standard for completeness. Revisions and additions are welcome.

References

Discographies of American artists
Punk rock group discographies